Marvell Technology, Inc. is an American company, headquartered in Santa Clara, California, which develops and produces semiconductors and related technology. Founded in 1995, the company had more than 7,000 employees as of 2023, with over 10,000 patents worldwide, and an annual revenue of $5.9 billion for fiscal 2023.

History
Marvell was founded in 1995 by Dr. Sehat Sutardja, his wife Weili Dai, and brother Pantas Sutardja.  The initial public offering on June 27, 2000 (near the end of the dot-com bubble) raised $90 million.

In April 2016, CEO Sehat Sutardja and President Weili Dai were ousted from their posts after activist investor Starboard Value fund took a roughly 7 percent stake in the company.

In July 2016, Marvell appointed Matt Murphy as its new President and CEO.

On July 6, 2018, Marvell completed its acquisition of Cavium, Inc. On the same day, it announced the appointment of Syed Ali (co-founder of Cavium, Inc., and previously the company's president and CEO), Brad Buss (director of Cavium, Inc.) and Edward Frank (director of Cavium, Inc.) to the Marvell Board of Directors.

In September 2019, Marvell completed the acquisition of Aquantia Corp.

In April 2021, Marvell completed the acquisition of Inphi Corporation. As part of the acquisition, Marvell reorganized so that the combined company is domiciled in Wilmington, Delaware.

Acquisitions
Through the years, Marvell acquired smaller companies to enter new markets.

Products

Compute

Data Processing Unit 
Marvell OCTEON and ARMADA DPUs which integrate a CPU, network interfaces and programmable data acceleration engines on a specialized electronic circuit.

Custom 
Marvell also offered Customer Specific Standard Product (CSSP), where customer accelerators and interefaces could be integrated directly into Marvell's Octeon processors. Following Marvell's 2019 acquisition of Avera Semiconductor (formerly the custom ASIC division of GlobalFoundries and prior to that of IBM), Marvell offers custom ASIC tailored to clients' specific design goals. And it provides services for ASICs development to the Aerospace and Defense industries through its independent subsidiary Marvell Government Solutions (MGS). In a joint venture with TSMC, Marvell introduced a 3nm product.

Infrastructure Processors

On November 12, 2019, Marvell announced that their ThunderX2 SoCs have been deployed on Microsoft Azure. On March 2, 2020, Marvell announced OCTEON Fusion and OCTEON TX2 5G infrastructure processors, as well as deals to provide processors for 5G Infrastructure for Huawei, Nokia, Ericsson, ZTE, and Samsung. On March 16, 2020, Marvell announced ThunderX3 and their plan for ThunderX4 in 2022. On August 28, 2020, Marvell announced plan to refocus their ThunderX Server Teams to their Custom Silicon Business.

Security Solutions 
Marvell's security-related products include their LiquidSecurity HSM Adapters and NITROX Cryptographic Offload Engines.

Networking 
Marvell's networking products include their FastLinQ Ethernet network adapters and controllers, Ethernet Switches, Ethernet PHYs and Automotive Ethernet.

Storage 
Marvell's products include SSD Controllers, HDD Controllers, HDD Preamplifiers, Storage Accelerators, and QLogic Fibre Channel Adapters and Controllers. On May 27, 2021, Marvell announced its first NVM Express SSD controllers to support PCI Express 5.0.

Other notable products
Marvell supplied the Wi-Fi chip for the original (first-generation) Apple iPhone. Marvell Mobile Hotspot (MMH) is an in-car Wi-Fi connectivity. The 2010 Audi A8 was the first automobile in the market to feature a factory-installed MMH.

Google's Chromecast products are powered by Marvell SoCs. Namely the Marvell ARMADA 1500 Mini SoC (88DE3005) for the Chromecast 1st gen and Marvell ARMADA 1500 Mini Plus SoC (88DE3006) for the Chromecast 2nd gen & Chromecast audio.
Synaptics acquired Marvell Multimedia Solutions on 2017-06-12  ARMADA 1500 SoC's are now produced under different names

Legal cases

Stock options
In 2006, the US Securities and Exchange Commission (SEC) started an inquiry on the company's stock option grant practices.
An investigation determined "grant dates were chosen with the benefit of hindsight" to make the options more valuable.
The press estimated that the founders and other executives had made $760 million in gains from the options, which were awarded by the founding couple, Sehat Sutardja and Weili Dai.
The SEC asked to interview the company general counsel Matthew Gloss, but Marvell claimed attorney–client privilege.
Gloss was fired just before the investigation results were announced in May 2007.
Abraham David Sofaer was hired to investigate the investigation after Gloss alleged it was not independent. In announcing the results of its own inquiry, the SEC did not give Marvell the credit granted other companies in the options scandal for cooperating with the SEC’s investigation or for cleaning up. At the time of the announcement, the co-acting regional director of the SEC’s San Francisco office stated, among other things, that the SEC did not believe that the lack of cooperation and remediation shown by Marvell merited much credit in terms being lenient with Marvell. In announcing its results, the SEC found that Gloss was not a participant in Dai and Sutardja’s backdating scheme.
Marvell restated its financial results, and stated that  Dai will no longer be executive vice president, chief operating officer, and a director but continue with the company in a non-management position.
The company agreed to pay a $10 million fine in 2008, but did not fire Dai nor replace Sutardja as chairman as stated by the investigating committee.

Patent infringement 
In December 2012, a Pittsburgh jury ruled that Marvell had infringed two patents (co-inventors Alek Kavčić and Jose Moura) by incorporating hard disk technology developed and owned by Carnegie Mellon University without a license. The technology, relating to improving hard disk data read accuracy at high speeds, was reported to have been used in 2.3 billion chips sold by Marvell between 2003 and 2012. The jury awarded damages of $1.17 billion, the third largest ever in a patent case at the time. The jury also found that the breach had been "willful", giving the judge discretion to award up to three times the original damage amount. In December 2012, the company lost its mistrial bid in this dispute. Post-trial hearings were scheduled for May 2013 and Marvell reported to be considering an appeal in the interim.
In August, US District Judge Nora Barry Fischer upheld the award.
On February 17, 2016, Marvell agreed to a settlement in which Marvell will pay Carnegie Mellon University $750,000,000.

See also 

 Marvell Software Solutions Israel

References

External links 

American companies established in 1995
1995 establishments in California
Companies based in Santa Clara, California
Companies listed on the Nasdaq
Fabless semiconductor companies
Computer companies established in 1995
Electronics companies established in 1995
Manufacturing companies based in the San Francisco Bay Area
Technology companies based in the San Francisco Bay Area
2000 initial public offerings